The 2020–21 NCAA Division III football season was the component of the 2020 college football season organized by the NCAA at the Division III level in the United States. Due to the COVID-19 pandemic, only a few games were played during the traditional fall season, including the annual Secretaries Cup between Coast Guard and Merchant Marine on November 14, 2020. For other teams that chose to play during the 2020–21 school year, the regular season began on February 6, 2021 and culminated on May 1.

The season concluded with the end of the regular season, as the playoffs and championship game were not held due to the pandemic.

Conference changes and new programs

Membership changes

Conference standings

Conferences that did not play
The following conferences did not hold a football season in fall 2020 or spring 2021.
Centennial Conference – announced on December 10, 2020, that fall and winter sports would not be held during their respective seasons or during the spring.
Commonwealth Coast Conference – announced on January 21, 2021, that all winter sports and previously cancelled sports seasons would not be held.
Eastern Collegiate Football Conference – announced on July 14, 2020, that the football season would not be played.
Liberty League – announced on November 9, 2020, that winter/spring sports and all previously postponed fall sports would not be played.
Middle Atlantic Conference – announced on March 22, 2021, that the previously postponed football season would not be rescheduled for the spring.
Massachusetts State Collegiate Athletic Conference – announced on January 22, 2021, that postponed fall sports would not be rescheduled for the spring.
Minnesota Intercollegiate Athletic Conference – announced on March 3, 2021, that spring seasons for fall sports would not be held.
Midwest Conference – announced on December 3, 2020, that fall and winter sports would be cancelled and not rescheduled.
North Coast Athletic Conference – announced on October 16, 2020, that fall sports seasons would not be held.
New England Small College Athletic Conference – announced on August 10, 2020, that fall sports seasons would not be held.
New England Women's and Men's Athletic Conference – announced on July 17, 2020, that fall sports seasons would not be held. Coast Guard and Merchant Marine, both federal service academies and NEWMAC members (Coast Guard in all sports and Merchant Marine in football only), chose to play their rivalry game in November 2020, but did not play any other football games in 2020–21.
Southern California Intercollegiate Athletic Conference – announced on December 1, 2020, that the fall and winter sports seasons that had previously been postponed would not be held.
Wisconsin Intercollegiate Athletic Conference – announced on July 27, 2020, that the fall sports seasons would not be held.

See also

2020 NCAA Division I FBS football season
2020–21 NCAA Division I FCS football season
2020–21 NCAA Division II football season
2020 NAIA football season

References